Alaying Town is a town of Fenghuang County in Hunan province of South China. It is famous for its street market in Western Hunan.

Fenghuang County
Towns of Xiangxi Tujia and Miao Autonomous Prefecture